Esther Day (née Milnes; 1752–1792) was a British author and philanthropist.

Life

Esther Milnes, an heiress, was the daughter of Elizabeth Milnes (d. 1757) and Richard Milnes (1705–1757), of Chesterfield. She was educated at "Mrs. Dennis's Female Boarding School in Queen's Square."

Milnes married Thomas Day (1748–1789) at Bath on 7 August 1778.

Thomas Day was a singular character: an abolitionist, socialist, republican, campaigner for clean air and land reclamation, and hugely popular writer of children's fiction. His unsuccessful — until meeting Esther Milnes — search for a wife and subsequent scheme to illegally adopt and educate a young girl, Sabrina Sidney, in an ultimately unsuccessful plan adapted from Jean-Jacques Rousseau's Emile, have provided much material for historians and other commentators. Despite that significant setback he continued a proponent of Rousseauism and insisted that he and his wife live a simple and secluded life. Esther was required to give up many of her social connections, luxuries, and previous leisure-time occupations, such as the harpsichord. Unusually, however, her husband insisted that she retain control over her own finances in case she ever tired of their ascetic style of life.

In 1779 the couple moved to a small estate at Stapleford Abbotts, near Abridge in Essex. In 1780, Thomas Day bought an estate at Anningsley in Surrey and the couple moved there in 1783. It was a philanthropic project whereby the Days sought to improve the lives of their workers.

Esther Day had no children, and Thomas Lowndes (born c. 1766), her nephew, was treated by the couple as their heir. Thomas Day died in a riding accident on 28 September 1789 and Esther Day, debilitated by her loss, died less than three years later.

After their deaths, Lowndes edited and published Select miscellaneous productions, of Mrs. Day, and Thomas Day in 1805; the collection consists of some unpublished works of Thomas Day, Esther Day's juvenilia, and some of his own poems to "increase the size of the work." The collection is dedicated to "the fair females of the British Isles," whom the editor reassures that with appropriate education, they would no doubt surpass men. In the "apology" which precedes Esther Day's work, Lowndes's comments informs us that the poems were written when she was between eleven and fifteen. He professes himself astonished that someone so talented should have ceased writing, and speculates that she may have been overly diffident. A twentieth-century commentator called it "earnest, remarkable work" for someone so young.

Works

Day, Esther Milnes, Thomas Day, and Thomas Lowndes. Select miscellaneous productions, of Mrs. Day, and Thomas Day, esq., in verse and prose: also, some detached pieces of poetry. London: Cadell and Davies, 1805 (Internet Archive)

Notes

References
"Day, Esther." The Women's Print History Project, 2019, Person ID 3818. Accessed 2022-08-16. 
"Day, Thomas, Day, Esther. Select Miscellaneous Productions, of Mrs. Day, and Thomas Day, Esq. in Verse and Prose: Also, Some Detached Pieces of Poetry, by Thomas Lowndes, Esq. Consisting of the first 52 Pages." The Women's Print History Project, 2019, title ID 12563. Accessed 2022-08-16.
Rowland, Peter. "Day, Thomas (1748–1789), author and political campaigner." Oxford Dictionary of National Biography.  03. Oxford University Press. Accessed 16 Aug. 2022.
 Seward, Anna. Life of Erasmus Darwin. Studley, Warwickshire: Brewin Books, 2010 (Internet Archive)
Stephen, Leslie. "Day, Thomas (1748–1789)." Oxford Dictionary of National Biography. Oxford University Press. Accessed 17 Aug. 2022.

Etexts
Day, Esther Milnes, 1753-1792; Day, Thomas, 1748-1789; Lowndes, Thomas, b. 1766?. Select miscellaneous productions, of Mrs. Day, and Thomas Day, esq., in verse and prose: also, some detached pieces of poetry. London: Cadell and Davies, 1805 (Digitization, Internet Archive)

See also
Thomas Day (writer)
Sabrina Sidney

External links
Online books

1752 births
1792 deaths
18th-century English women writers
18th-century English women
18th-century English writers
English women poets